Akgul Amanmuradova and Vesna Dolonc were the defending champions, having won the event in 2012, but both players decided not to participate in 2013.

Naomi Broady and Kristýna Plíšková won the tournament, defeating Raluca Olaru and Tamira Paszek, 6–3, 3–6, [10–5].

Seeds

Draw

References 
 Draw

2013 ITF Women's Circuit